Marmyzhi is a rural locality in Mashkinsky Selsoviet Rural Settlement, Konyshyovsky District, Kursk Oblast, Russia. Population:

Geography 
The village is located in the Zhigayevka River basin (a left tributary of the Svapa River), 68 km from the Russia–Ukraine border, 67 km north-west of Kursk, 22 km north-east of the district center – the urban-type settlement Konyshyovka, 10 km from the selsoviet center – Mashkino.

 Climate
Marmyzhi has a warm-summer humid continental climate (Dfb in the Köppen climate classification).

Transport 
Marmyzhi is located 59 km from the federal route  Ukraine Highway, 33 km from the route  Crimea Highway, 23 km from the route  (Trosna – M3 highway), 6 km from the road of regional importance  (Fatezh – Dmitriyev), 5.5 km from the road  (Konyshyovka – Zhigayevo – 38K-038), on the road of intermunicipal significance  (38K-005 – Marmyzhi – Mashkino), 11.5 km from the nearest railway halt 543 km (railway line Navlya – Lgov-Kiyevsky).

The rural locality is situated 72 km from Kursk Vostochny Airport, 176 km from Belgorod International Airport and 268 km from Voronezh Peter the Great Airport.

References

Notes

Sources

Rural localities in Konyshyovsky District